Darreh Shur (also Romanized as Darreh Shūr; also known as Darrehshūr) is a village in Shalil Rural District, Miankuh District, Ardal County, Chaharmahal and Bakhtiari Province, Iran. At the 2006 census, its population was 8, in 8 families.

References 

Populated places in Ardal County